Andora is a genus of echinoderms belonging to the family Ophidiasteridae.

The species of this genus are found in Malesia and Indian Ocean.

Species:

Andora bruuni 
Andora faouzii 
Andora popei 
Andora wilsoni

References

Ophidiasteridae
Asteroidea genera